"Lo Fiolairé" (occitan la fialaire,  the spinner) is a traditional Occitan song, from the region of Aurillac and Haute-Auvergne, composed by an anonymous author in the Occitan language.

History and content 
The piece was recovered by the composer Joseph Canteloube between 1923-1930 and inserted in the collection Chants d'Auvergne (Songs from Auvergne), where he transcribed it with arrangement for soprano and orchestra. In 1964 Luciano Berio transcribed the piece in turn, with an arrangement for voice (mezzo-soprano), flute, clarinet, harp, percussion, viola and cello. The musical piece was included in the song cycle Folk Songs collection and was recorded by his Armenian wife, Cathy Berberian.

It is a canso, a poetic composition, composed of twelve lines (four triplets, the rhymes are identical in all the stanzas; there is also the rima estamp, which is found in the same place from verse to verse (coblas unisonans).

The song tells the story of a shepherdess who remembers that when she was very young, while she was looking after the flock, she also had a stick to spin and had called a shepherd to help her, but he in return asked him for a kiss and she, who was not an ungrateful one, he gave her two.

Other versions 
Arleen Auger
Sara Macliver
Netania Davrath
Sarah Davis
Albena Kechlibareva
Orna Arania
Dawn Upshaw
Véronique Gens

Discography
1964, Luciano Berio, Folk Songs
 2005, Osvaldo Golijov in the CD Ayre, with Dawn Upshaw & The Andalucian Dogs, Deutsche Grammophon GmbH, Hamburg

References

Songwriter unknown
Folk songs
French folk songs